Calvin Zola-Makongo (born 31 December 1984), often known simply as Calvin Zola is a Congolese former professional footballer who played as a forward. Born in Kinshasa, Zaire, he began his career as a youth player at Newcastle United. Zola went on to have spells at Tranmere Rovers, Crewe Alexandra, Burton Albion and Aberdeen. His last club was Stevenage, who released him in May 2015 due to injury setbacks.

Career
Zola began his career Newcastle United, and he spent a loan spell at Oldham Athletic before moving to Tranmere Rovers, where problems were discovered with his visa and he was unable to work (i.e. play) until a solution was reached. In May 2005 he was granted a full permit and returned in time for training for the 2005–06 season.

In June 2008, he signed with League One club Crewe Alexandra for a transfer fee of £200,000. On 18 January 2011, he signed on loan to Burton Albion until the end of the season. In May 2011, Zola was released from his contract at Crewe Alexandra. and agreed to join Burton on a permanent basis the following month.

On 18 June 2013, Zola signed a two-year deal with Scottish Premiership side Aberdeen. He scored his first goal for Aberdeen on 14 September 2013, in a 3–0 win against Partick Thistle. Zola had his contract cancelled by Aberdeen after the 2013–14 season, during which he had scored three goals.

Zola joined Stevenage on 20 June 2014 following his release from Aberdeen.

After an injury hit season, Zola was released by Stevenage on 20 May 2015, along with 12 other players.

Career statistics

References

External links
Calvin Zola player profile at Burton Albion F.C.
Calvin Zola Makongo player profile at crewealex.net

1984 births
Living people
Footballers from Kinshasa
Democratic Republic of the Congo footballers
Association football forwards
Newcastle United F.C. players
Oldham Athletic A.F.C. players
Tranmere Rovers F.C. players
Crewe Alexandra F.C. players
Burton Albion F.C. players
Aberdeen F.C. players
Stevenage F.C. players
English Football League players
Scottish Professional Football League players
English sportspeople of Democratic Republic of the Congo descent